Nicole Jones (born 18 August 1963) is a former Bermudian woman cricketer. She played for Bermuda at the 2008 Women's Cricket World Cup Qualifier.

References

External links 

1963 births
Living people
Bermudian women cricketers